Perz is a surname. Notable people with the surname include:
 Helmuth Perz (born 1923), Austrian long-distance runner
 Mickey Perz (born 1984), Filipino-Swiss dancer
 Rosa Perz, Austrian luger
 Rudolf Perz (born 1972), Austrian footballer
 Sally Perz, American politician
Bertrand Perz, Austrian academic

See also